Chłopowo may refer to the following places:
Chłopowo, Choszczno County in West Pomeranian Voivodeship (north-west Poland)
Chłopowo, Myślibórz County in West Pomeranian Voivodeship (north-west Poland)
Chłopowo, Szczecinek County in West Pomeranian Voivodeship (north-west Poland)